Denis Leslie Russell  (2 July 1909 – 29 December 1986) was an English first-class cricketer active 1928–32 who played for Middlesex and Oxford University. He was born in Paddington, Middlesex; died in Merrow, Surrey.

Russell was educated at Beaumont College, Berkshire, and University College, Oxford. During World War II he was an officer in GHQ Liaison Regiment.  At the end of the war he was appointed MBE (along with many other servicemen) "in recognition of gallant and distinguished services in North-West Europe." He also received a formal mention in despatches after the war. He was awarded the Territorial Decoration in 1950.

References

External links
Wisden – Obituaries in 1987 including Denis Russell

1909 births
1986 deaths
English cricketers
Middlesex cricketers
Oxford University cricketers
People from Paddington
People educated at Beaumont College
Alumni of University College, Oxford
Reconnaissance Corps officers
British Army personnel of World War II
Military personnel from Middlesex
H. D. G. Leveson Gower's XI cricketers